East Douglas is a census-designated place (CDP) in the town of Douglas in Worcester County, Massachusetts, United States. The population was 2,557 at the 2010 census.

Geography

East Douglas is located at  (42.075272, -71.713636).

According to the United States Census Bureau, the CDP has a total area of 9.1 km2 (3.5 mi2). 8.9 km2 (3.4 mi2) of it is land and 0.2 km2 (0.1 mi2) of it (2.56%) is water.

Demographics

As of the census of 2000, there were 2,319 people, 916 households, and 628 families residing in the CDP. The population density was 261.8/km2 (678.7/mi2). There were 936 housing units at an average density of 105.7/km2 (273.9/mi2). The racial makeup of the CDP was 97.59% White, 0.43% African American, 0.43% Asian, 0.39% from other races, and 1.16% from two or more races. Hispanic or Latino of any race were 0.86% of the population.

There were 916 households, out of which 35.8% had children under the age of 18 living with them, 54.0% were married couples living together, 11.1% had a female householder with no husband present, and 31.4% were non-families. 27.0% of all households were made up of individuals, and 12.6% had someone living alone who was 65 years of age or older. The average household size was 2.53 and the average family size was 3.10.

In the CDP, the population was spread out, with 27.1% under the age of 18, 6.3% from 18 to 24, 37.0% from 25 to 44, 17.5% from 45 to 64, and 12.1% who were 65 years of age or older. The median age was 34 years. For every 100 females, there were 93.4 males. For every 100 females age 18 and over, there were 90.2 males.

The median income for a household in the CDP was $55,208, and the median income for a family was $58,517. Males had a median income of $41,116 versus $31,420 for females. The per capita income for the CDP was $22,274. About 6.8% of families and 9.7% of the population were below the poverty line, including 13.6% of those under age 18 and 26.0% of those age 65 or over.

References

Census-designated places in Worcester County, Massachusetts
Census-designated places in Massachusetts
Douglas, Massachusetts